

Adolf Eduard Trowitz (24 September 1893 – 3 January 1978) was a German general (Generalmajor) in the Wehrmacht during World War II who commanded several divisions.  He was a recipient of the Knight's Cross of the Iron Cross, awarded by Nazi Germany for successful military leadership.

Trowitz surrendered to the Red Army in the course of the Soviet July 1944 Bobruysk Offensive (part of Operation Bagration). Convicted as a war criminal in the Soviet Union, he was held until 1955.

Awards and decorations

 German Cross in Gold (8 June 1942)
 Knight's Cross of the Iron Cross on 21 February 1944 as Generalmajor and commander of 57. Infanterie-Division

References

Citations

Bibliography

 

1893 births
1978 deaths
People from Dessau-Roßlau
Major generals of the German Army (Wehrmacht)
German Army personnel of World War I
Recipients of the Gold German Cross
Recipients of the Knight's Cross of the Iron Cross
German prisoners of war in World War II held by the Soviet Union
People from the Duchy of Anhalt
Prussian Army personnel
Recipients of the clasp to the Iron Cross, 1st class
Military personnel from Saxony-Anhalt
German Army generals of World War II